The Division of Bonython was an Australian Electoral Division in South Australia between 1955 and 2004. In its final configuration, it was based on the outer northern suburbs of Elizabeth, Munno Para, Parafield, Paralowie, Salisbury, Virginia, and to the town of One Tree Hill in Adelaide's outskirts. Bonython's first 14 years saw vast boundaries simultaneously cover as far north as Gawler, as far south as Magill Road at Norwood, and as far west as Ottoway. The seat would continue to cross south of Grand Junction Road until the creation of the Division of Makin at the pre-1984 redistribution.

The division was named for Sir Langdon Bonython, philanthropist, publisher, and one of South Australia's federation parliamentarians. It was created as a safe Labor seat, carved mostly from the Labor-leaning portions of the neighbouring Division of Sturt, and was thus a natural choice for Sturt's Labor incumbent, Norman Makin, to transfer in 1955. Besides Makin, its most notable member was Neal Blewett, a minister in the Hawke and Keating Governments.

From creation until the 1984 expansion of parliament, Bonython was Labor's second safest seat in South Australia, behind the neighbouring Division of Port Adelaide directly west of Bonython. From 1984 until 1998, Bonython was Labor's safest seat in South Australia. The Liberals only came close to winning it once, in 1966 when they managed to hold Labor to only 52 percent of the two-party vote.

Bonython was abolished in 2004. Apart from the south-west area between Port Wakefield Road and Main North Road which was shifted to Port Adelaide, the majority of abolished Bonython was shifted to Wakefield in the pre-2004 redistribution, transforming Wakefield from a safe Liberal seat to a notionally marginal Labor seat as a result. Wakefield was replaced by Spence after a 2018 redistribution, on boundaries similar to those of Bonython at the time the latter was abolished.

Members

Election results

References

External links
Bonython boundary map, 2001: AEC
 SA boundary map, 2001: AEC
SA boundary map, 1984: Atlas SA

Bonython